The following highways are numbered 747:

Canada
Alberta Highway 747
Saskatchewan Highway 747

Costa Rica
 National Route 747

United States